The Falkland Islands Development Corporation (FIDC) is a quasi-autonomous, government-established, largely self-funding body responsible for encouraging the economic development of the Falkland Islands.  It was set up in 1984 and is mainly funded from its own reserves and income streams.  Initiatives it has fostered include air transport, connection to the global containerised shipping network, supporting agricultural diversification, establishing a meat export industry and promoting tourism.  It also offers advice, loans and grants to further local business development.

References

External links
 FIDC

1984 establishments in the Falkland Islands
Economy of the Falkland Islands
Organizations established in 1984